Events from the year 1959 in Canada.

Incumbents

Crown 
 Monarch – Elizabeth II

Federal government 
 Governor General – Vincent Massey (until September 15) then Georges Vanier
 Prime Minister – John Diefenbaker
 Chief Justice – Patrick Kerwin (Ontario)
 Parliament – 24th

Provincial governments

Lieutenant governors 
Lieutenant Governor of Alberta – John J. Bowlen (until December 16) then John Percy Page (from December 19)   
Lieutenant Governor of British Columbia – Frank Mackenzie Ross
Lieutenant Governor of Manitoba – John Stewart McDiarmid 
Lieutenant Governor of New Brunswick – Joseph Leonard O'Brien  
Lieutenant Governor of Newfoundland – Campbell Leonard Macpherson 
Lieutenant Governor of Nova Scotia – Edward Chester Plow 
Lieutenant Governor of Ontario – John Keiller MacKay 
Lieutenant Governor of Prince Edward Island – Frederick Walter Hyndman
Lieutenant Governor of Quebec – Onésime Gagnon  
Lieutenant Governor of Saskatchewan – Frank Lindsay Bastedo

Premiers 
Premier of Alberta – Ernest Manning   
Premier of British Columbia – W.A.C. Bennett 
Premier of Manitoba – Dufferin Roblin  
Premier of New Brunswick – Hugh John Flemming  
Premier of Newfoundland – Joey Smallwood 
Premier of Nova Scotia – Robert Stanfield 
Premier of Ontario – Leslie Frost 
Premier of Prince Edward Island – Alex Matheson (until September 16) then  Walter Shaw 
Premier of Quebec – Maurice Duplessis (until September 7) then Paul Sauvé (from September 11)  
Premier of Saskatchewan – Tommy Douglas

Territorial governments

Commissioners 
 Commissioner of Yukon – Frederick Howard Collins 
 Commissioner of Northwest Territories – Robert Gordon Robertson

Events
 February 20: Avro Arrow project is terminated
 April 1: The St. Lawrence Seaway opens
 June 11: 1959 Ontario general election: Leslie Frost's PCs win a fifth consecutive majority
 June 18: 1959 Alberta general election: Ernest Manning's Social Credit Party wins a seventh consecutive majority
 June 20: The Escuminac Disaster results in 35 fishermen drowned or missing and 22 fishing boats sunk.
 September 7: Maurice Duplessis, Premier of Quebec, dies in office
 September 11: Paul Sauvé becomes premier of Quebec
 September 15: Georges Vanier is sworn in as Governor General replacing Vincent Massey.  He is the first French Canadian Governor General.
 September 16: Walter Shaw becomes premier of Prince Edward Island, replacing Alex Matheson
 October 12: Isabella Memorial (Montreal) unveiled
 November 18: Canadian content rules are introduced for television.
 December 2: York University is founded

Full date unknown
 National Energy Board of Canada is created.
 Steven Truscott falsely convicted of the murder of Lynne Harper. He would be exonerated in 2007.
 Vancouver Folk Song Society is founded.

Arts and literature

New books
 Mordecai Richler: The Apprenticeship of Duddy Kravitz
 Hugh MacLennan: The Watch That Ends the Night
 Farley Mowat: Grey Seas Under
 Max Aitken: Friends
 Gordon R. Dickson: Dorsai!

Awards
 See 1959 Governor General's Awards for a complete list of winners and finalists for those awards.

Sport
April 18 - Montreal Canadiens won their Eleventh (and Fourth consecutive) Stanley Cup by defeating the Toronto Maple Leafs 4 games to 1. The deciding Game 5 was played at the Montreal Forum
May 1 -  Manitoba Junior Hockey League's Winnipeg Braves won their only Memorial Cup by defeating the Ontario Hockey Association's Peterborough TPT Petes 4 games to 1. The deciding Game 5 was played at Wheat City Arena in Brandon, Manitoba
November 1 – Montreal Canadiens Jacques Plante becomes the first ice hockey goalie to wear a protective face mask during a game against the New York Rangers at the Montreal Forum
November 28 - Winnipeg Blue Bombers won their Fifth Grey Cup by defeating the Hamilton Tiger-Cats 21 to 7 in the 47th Grey Cup played at Toronto's CNE Stadium

Births

January to March
 January 1 – Sharon Bayes, field hockey player
 January 3 – Dwight Duncan, politician and Minister
 January 8 – Bill Sawchuk, swimmer
 January 11 – Rob Ramage, ice hockey player
 January 12 – Helen Vanderburg, synchronized swimmer
 May 25 – Rick Wamsley, ice hockey player

April to June
 April 5 – Stephen Feraday, javelin thrower
 April 6 – Jim Rondeau, politician

 April 13 – Genevieve Robic-Brunet, road racing cyclist
 April 15 – Kevin Lowe, ice hockey player
 April 22 – Ryan Stiles, actor, comedian, director and voice actor
 April 30 – Paul Gross, actor, producer, director, singer and writer
 April 30 – Stephen Harper, politician and 22nd Prime Minister of Canada
 May 14 – Rick Vaive, ice hockey player
 May 26 – Brian Peaker, rower and Olympic silver medalist
 May 27 
 Eugene Melnyk, businessman and sports franchise owner (d. 2022)
 Donna Strickland, physicist, recipient of Nobel Prize in Physics
 June 2 – Charlie Huddy, Canadian-American ice hockey player and coach
 June 4 – Rex Barnes, politician

 June 9 - Louis Hamelin, writer
 June 12 – Scott Thompson, comedian
 June 20 – Louise Bessette, pianist
 June 28 – Brad Fraser, playwright, screenwriter and cultural commentator

July to December
 August 29 – Chris Hadfield, astronaut, first Canadian to walk in space
 September 29 – Robert Thibault, politician
 October 14 – Dominic Agostino, politician (d.2004)
 October 20 – Janice McCaffrey, racewalker
 November 5 – Bryan Adams, rock singer-songwriter and photographer
 November 17 – Guy André, politician
 November 22 – Geoff Regan, politician
 December 2 – David Alward, 32nd Premier of New Brunswick
 December 8 – Mark Steyn, writer and broadcaster

Full date unknown
 Michael Slobodian, murderer responsible for the Centennial Secondary School shooting (d.1975)

Deaths

 January 26 – Barbara Hanley, first woman to be elected a mayor in Canada (b.1882)
 February 11 – Harry James Barber, politician (b.1875)
 February 13 – Thomas Laird Kennedy, politician and 15th Premier of Ontario (b.1878)
 March 3 – Philémon Cousineau, politician (b.1874)
 March 17 – Sidney Earle Smith, academic and 7th President of the University of Toronto (b.1897)

 April 8 – George Croil, first Chief of the Air Staff of the Royal Canadian Air Force (b.1893)
 June 3 – Filip Konowal, soldier, Victoria Cross recipient in 1917 (b.1888)
 June 9 - Lynne Harper, murder victim (b.1946)
 September 7 – Maurice Duplessis, politician and 16th Premier of Quebec (b.1890)
 October 25 – Samuel Lawrence, politician and trade unionist (b.1879)

Full date unknown
 Edwin Hansford, politician (b.1895)

See also
 List of Canadian films

References

 
Years of the 20th century in Canada
Canada
1959 in North America